Capitol Broadcasting Tower Broadway is a  guyed tower for TV transmission near Broadway, North Carolina, USA at . Capitol Broadcasting Tower was built in 2002-2003 and replaced the Capitol Broadcasting Tower Broadway damaged in a plane crash. 

The tower which it replaced was also 533.1 metre high guyed tower for TV transmission built in 1985. It broadcast the signal of now defunct WKFT TV  40 licensed to Fayetteville and is utilized as an auxiliary broadcast tower for WRAL-TV in Raleigh. 

The tower was destroyed when a courier plane flew into it on March 14, 2002. The tower was rebuilt by Capitol Broadcasting and the transmitter, antenna and transmission line were replaced by Bahakel Communications, owner of WKFT at the time. WKFT was sold to Univision and rebranded as WUVC shortly after the tower was replaced. 

The tower was (and still is) located near the Harnett-Lee County border. The tower is actually in Harnett County while one guy anchor point and the actual town of Broadway are in Lee County.

External links
  (dismantled)
 

Buildings and structures in Lee County, North Carolina
Buildings and structures in Harnett County, North Carolina
Towers in North Carolina